Makhdoom Syed Ali Akbar Mehmood is a Pakistani politician who was a member of the Provincial Assembly of the Punjab, from August 2013 to May 2018.

Early life and education
He was born on 12 May 1963 in Karachi.

He has the degree of Bachelor of Arts (Hons).

He is a Landlord. Most of his time he spent in his Mango Garden in Jamal Din Wali, RYK.

Political career

He was elected to the Provincial Assembly of the Punjab as a candidate of Pakistan Peoples Party from Constituency PP-292 (Rahimyar Khan-VIII) in by-polls held in August 2013.

References

Living people
Punjab MPAs 2013–2018
1963 births
Pakistan People's Party MPAs (Punjab)